Brunfelsia membranacea is a species of flowering plant in the family Solanaceae, the nightshades. It is endemic to Jamaica.

References

membranacea
Endemic flora of Jamaica
Vulnerable plants
Taxonomy articles created by Polbot